Shaibu Mahama (born October 15, 1970) is a Ghanaian politician and member of the Seventh Parliament of the Fourth Republic of Ghana representing the Daboya-Mankarigu Constituency in the Northern Region on the ticket of the National Democratic Congress.

Early life and education 
Mahama was born on October 15, 1970. He hails from Daboya, a town in the Northern Region of Ghana. He entered Leicester Business School, UK and obtained his Master of Business Administration degree in finance in 2001. He also attended University of Cape Coast, Ghana and obtained a Bachelor of Commerce with Diploma in Education in 1997. He also attended Kwame Nkrumah University of Science and Technology, and Ghana School of Law, in 2008 and 2010 respectively.

Politics 
Mahama is a member of the National Democratic Congress (NDC). In 2012, he contested for the Daboya-Mankarigu seat on the ticket of the NDC sixth parliament of the fourth republic and won.

Employment 
 Legal Office, Savanna Accelerated Development Authority (SADA), Accra Office

Personal life 
Mahama is a Muslim, and is married with five children.

References

Ghanaian MPs 2017–2021
1970 births
Living people
Ghanaian Muslims
National Democratic Congress (Ghana) politicians